The Brisbane Lions' 2017 season was the club's 21st season in the Australian Football League (AFL) and 1st in AFL Women's (AFLW).

AFL

List changes

After suffering a heavy knock to the head at training on January 18, 2016, defender Justin Clarke was ruled out of football indefinitely, eventually retiring due to long-term health concerns. At the end of the 2016 season Trent West and Daniel Merrett both retired as well, Trent due to injury frustrations and Merrett due to wanting to spend more time with his family. The Lions also delisted five players: Hugh Beasley, Billy Evans, Josh McGuinness, Jackson Paine and Josh Watts.

During the trade period, Brisbane traded Irishman Pearce Hanley to rival club  in a complicated three-way trade also involving . Out of contract  player Jack Frost requested a trade to Brisbane after not managing to play an AFL match in 2016. He was traded to Brisbane along with Pick 76 in the 2016 national draft and Collilngwood's third round pick in the 2017 national draft in exchange for Brisbane's third and fourth round picks in the 2017 national draft. After the trade period Brisbane delisted forward Josh Green.

Retirements and delistings

Trades

National draft

Rookie draft

Squad

Results

Pre-season

Premiership season

After the week off they played against top eight side  and won by 57 points to end their losing streak and take the Dockers out of the top eight. Their form improved somewhat for the rest of the season, winning a total of five games before the final round. Their final match was against  with the loser to finish on the bottom of the ladder. When North Melbourne won the match by 51 points, Brisbane secured their first wooden spoon since 1998.

Ladder

Attendances

AFL Women's
In May 2016, the club launched a bid to enter a team in the inaugural AFL Women's season in 2017. 
The Brisbane Lions were granted a license on 15 June 2016, becoming one of eight teams to compete in the league's first season. Former AFL Queensland employee Breeanna Brock was appointed to the position of Women’s CEO the following day.

Tayla Harris and Sabrina Frederick-Traub were the club's first signings, unveiled along with the league's other 14 marquee players on 27 July 2016. A further 23 senior players and two rookie players were added to the club's inaugural list in the league's drafting and signing period. Emma Zielke will captain the team for their inaugural season.

Former Collingwood and Brisbane Bears player and AFL Queensland coach Craig Starcevich was appointed the team's inaugural head coach in June 2016. The rest of the coaching team was announced on 8 November 2016 as David Lake as the midfield coach, Daniel Merrett as the backline coach and Brent Staker as the forward coach.

Existing club sponsor Hyundai, along with Epic Pharmacy, will sponsor the team in 2017.

The team plays its home games at the South Pine Sports Complex in Brendale.

2017 squad

Results

2016 Exhibition games

2017 Pre-season

2017 season

Ladder

NEAFL

Brisbane also fielded their reserves team in the North East Australian Football League for the 7th season. They won 15 of their 18 regular season games to finish 2nd on the ladder, then won finals against Sydney University and 's reserves team to claim their 3rd premiership in the league.

See also
 Brisbane Lions
 2017 AFL season
 AFL Women's
 2017 AFL Women's season

References

External links
 Official website of the Brisbane Lions Football Club
Official AFL website
Official AFL Women's website

Brisbane Lions seasons
Brisbane
Brisbane